Borderline tuberculoid leprosy is a cutaneous condition similar to tuberculoid leprosy except the skin lesions are smaller and more numerous.

See also 
 Leprosy
 Skin lesion

References

External links 

Bacterium-related cutaneous conditions